Howard Chi Hang is an American chemist and professor in the Department of Immunology and Microbiology and Department of Chemistry at The Scripps Research Institute. He was previously Richard E. Salomon Family Associate Professor and the head of the Laboratory of Chemical Biology and Microbial Pathogenesis at the Rockefeller University in New York City. He won the Eli Lilly Award in Biological Chemistry in 2017.

Education and Career 
Hang earned a BS in Chemistry from the University of California, Santa Cruz in 1998, and a PhD in chemistry from the University of California, Berkeley in 2003 where he carried out research in the group Professor Carolyn Bertozzi. He then worked with Professor Hidde Ploegh at Harvard Medical School and the Whitehead Institute of Biomedical Research from 2004 through 2006 as a Damon Runyon Cancer Research Foundation Postdoctoral Fellow. He set up his own lab at the Rockefeller University in 2007 and moved to The Scripps Research Institute in 2020.

Research 
Hang's work involves developing chemical methods to understand mechanisms of how immune cells and invading microbes interact, and to develop new methods to combat infections.

References

Year of birth missing (living people)
Living people
21st-century American chemists
University of California, Berkeley alumni
University of California, Santa Cruz alumni
Rockefeller University faculty